Dell Hanson (born March 17, 1935) is an American politician in the state of Iowa.

Hanson was born in Benton County, Iowa. He is a businessman (implement dealer) and former county supervisor of Benton County. A Republican, he served in the Iowa House of Representatives from 2003 to 2005 (39th district).

References

1935 births
Living people
People from Benton County, Iowa
Businesspeople from Iowa
County supervisors in Iowa
Republican Party members of the Iowa House of Representatives